New Zoveng is a village in the Churachandpur district of Manipur, India. Geographically, it is an extension of Zoveng and Hiangzou wards. Its inhabitants are mainly from the Zou community. Mr.Nengkhai is the present chief of New Zoveng.

References

Villages in Churachandpur district